Pseudotragiscus venus is a species of beetle in the family Cerambycidae, and the only species in the genus Pseudotragiscus. It was described by Karl Jordan in 1903.

References

Tragocephalini
Beetles described in 1903